Michèle Wolf (born 22 January 1961) is a Swiss fencer. She competed in the women's individual and team épée events at the 1996 Summer Olympics.

References

External links
 

1961 births
Living people
Swiss female épée fencers
Olympic fencers of Switzerland
Fencers at the 1996 Summer Olympics
Sportspeople from Luxembourg City